Omega II or Omega 2, is a sector in south-western Greater Noida, Uttar Pradesh, India, primarily known for serving the NRI City. Bordered by Omega I to the south, PSI-I to the west and Knowledge Park I to the north, it is also shares close proximity with the Yamuna Expressway. It is named after the Greek letter Omega.

References 

Geography of Uttar Pradesh